Albert Edward Jull (6 December 1864 – 24 September 1940) was a New Zealand politician of the Liberal Party, the United Party and from 1938 the National Party.

Canada
Jull was born in Fort Erie, Ontario, Canada, in 1864. He received his education in Brantford at various public schools.

Life in New Zealand
He came to New Zealand with his parents in 1877. He arrived in Waipawa in 1881, for some years was engaged in store-keeping, and subsequently established himself in the brewing industry. Jull was chairman of the Waipawa County Council, was elected president of the New Zealand Counties Association in 1901, was for some years chairman of the Waipawa Town Board and of the District Hospital Board, and in 1894 was president of the New Zealand Fire Brigades' Association. He is an enthusiastic Oddfellow, is a Past Provincial Grand Master of the Hawke's Bay district, and in 1906 represented the district at the biennial conference held at Nelson. He chaired the Napier Harbour Board for 20 years, a role from which he retired in 1932.

Political activity

Jull first stood for the rural Hawke's Bay Region electorate of Waipawa in 1911 for the Liberal Party, coming second to George Hunter. Jull came second again in 1914 and 1919.

Jull represented the Waipawa electorate from the 1930 by-election after the death of Hunter.

In the 1935 election he was defeated by Labour's Max Christie. In 1938 he won the seat back from Christie, and held it until his death.

Jull died suddenly in Waipawa on 24 September 1940.

Notes

References
 This article incorporates text from a publication now in the public domain: 

1864 births
1940 deaths
New Zealand National Party MPs
New Zealand Liberal Party MPs
People from the Hawke's Bay Region
People from Fort Erie, Ontario
Canadian emigrants to New Zealand
Local politicians in New Zealand
United Party (New Zealand) MPs
Members of the New Zealand House of Representatives
Unsuccessful candidates in the 1911 New Zealand general election
Unsuccessful candidates in the 1914 New Zealand general election
Unsuccessful candidates in the 1919 New Zealand general election
Unsuccessful candidates in the 1922 New Zealand general election
Unsuccessful candidates in the 1935 New Zealand general election
New Zealand MPs for North Island electorates